Ivan Jević (Jević, born 23 July 1975) is a Serbian professional football coach and a former player who played as a defender. He is an assistant coach with the Kazakhstani club Tobol.

Honours
With Kitchee:
Hong Kong League Cup: 2005–06
Hong Kong Senior Shield: 2005–06

Personal Hononrs:
Hong Kong Senior Shield Best Defender: 2005–06

Career statistics

Club career
As of 25 December 2006

Notes and references

External links
 Ivan Jević at HKFA
 
 Profile at Srbijafudbal.

Accolades

1975 births
Footballers from Belgrade
Living people
Serbian footballers
Association football defenders
FK Hajduk Beograd players
FK Javor Ivanjica players
FC Spartak Vladikavkaz players
Kitchee SC players
FK Radnički Beograd players
FK Brodarac players
Russian Premier League players
Hong Kong First Division League players
Hong Kong League XI representative players
Serbian expatriate footballers
Expatriate footballers in Russia
Serbian expatriate sportspeople in Russia
Expatriate footballers in Hong Kong
Serbian expatriate sportspeople in Hong Kong
Serbian football managers
FK Radnički Niš managers
Serbian expatriate football managers
Expatriate football managers in Uzbekistan
Serbian expatriate sportspeople in Uzbekistan
Expatriate football managers in Belarus
Serbian expatriate sportspeople in Belarus
Expatriate football managers in Kazakhstan
Serbian expatriate sportspeople in Kazakhstan